Khokababu   is a Bengali television soap opera that premiered on May 9, 2016, and aired on Star Jalsha. Produced by Snehasish Chakraborty, it stars Pratik Sen and Trina Saha in lead role. The series ended on 29 July 2018.

Plot 
Khoka, an innocent wrestler from Kusumpur, falls in love with Tori, a spoilt brat from Kolkata. Khoka is very innocent with having moral values. He obeys his mother Koushalya very much and loves his family. On other side Tori, a spoilt brat, is totally opposite in nature of Khoka. But Tori has a good heart. Tori's marriage is fixed with Preet and the engagement is also done. Coincidentally one day Khoka and Tori meet and get into a heated argument. Khoka keeps himself away from Tori because he is a Baal Brahmachaari and Tori too dislikes him initially before they eventually get married.

Cast

Main
 Pratik Sen as Raghunath Mukherjee a.k.a. Khokababu, Tori's husband. 
 Trina Saha as Tori

Recurring
 Rupsha Chakraborty as Oishee Ganguly
 Debjani Chattopadhyay as Anuradha Ganguly
 Mousumi Saha as Koushalya Mukherjee
 Kushal Chakraborty as Jagannath Mukherjee
 Bimal Chakraborty as Raj Sekhar Ganguly 
 Aditya Chowdhury as Preet 
 Raja Chatterjee as Paresh Mukherjee a.k.a. Paresh President
 Srabanti Mukherjee as Arati Mukherjee
 Upanita Banerjee / Misty Singh as Bani 
 Purbasha Roy as Mayuri 
 Tapashi Roy Chowdhury as Rajlekha Ganguly, Tithi's Mother
 Meghna Mukherjee as Tithi
 Sougata Dasgupta as Turjo
 Madhurima Basak as Raka Bose

Adaptations

References

External links
Khokababu Streaming on Hotstar

2016 Indian television series debuts
2018 Indian television series endings
Bengali-language television programming in India
Indian romance television series
Star Jalsha original programming